Sebastián Ignacio Martínez Muñoz (born 6 June 1993) is a Chilean footballer who currently plays for Barnechea as a midfielder.

Career
He debuted on 22 October 2011, in a 1-1 draw of Universidad de Chile against Palestino for the 2011 Torneo Clausura, replacing Gabriel Vargas in the halftime.

References

External links
 

Living people
1993 births
Chilean footballers
Universidad de Chile footballers
C.D. Huachipato footballers
Chilean Primera División players
Chile under-20 international footballers
Chile international footballers
Association football midfielders